Andrei Gabriel Ureche (born 27 September 1998) is a Romanian professional footballer who plays as a goalkeeper for Liga I side FC Botoșani. In his career, Ureche also played for teams such as: SC Bacău, Unión Adarve and FC Argeș Pitești.

References

External links
 

1998 births
Living people
People from Pașcani
Romanian footballers
Association football goalkeepers
Liga I players
Liga II players
LPS HD Clinceni players
FC Argeș Pitești players
FC Botoșani players
Romanian expatriate footballers
Romanian expatriate sportspeople in Spain
Expatriate footballers in Spain